Stanley Bergerman (August 27, 1903 – July 13, 1998) was an American producer of horror films in the 1930s.

Biography
Bergerman was born on August 27, 1903 to a Jewish family in Pueblo, Colorado and raised in San Diego, California. As a young adult, he worked for The May Department Stores Company in Los Angeles as a merchandise manager. After he married Rosabelle Laemmle in 1929, the daughter of Universal Pictures founder Carl Laemmle, he entered the film industry and started producing films focusing on horror films and sports documentaries. He later worked as a talent manager and a commercial real estate investor.

During World War II, Bergerman helped to establish the Refugee Resettlement Committee which assisted Jews fleeing Nazi Germany to immigrate to the United States. He was a supporter of the United Way, the American Red Cross, the Jewish Home for the Aging, the Los Angeles chapter of the National Conference of Christians and Jews, the Motion Picture and Television Fund, and the Anti-Defamation League of B'nai B'rith.

Personal life
His first wife was Rosabelle Laemmle, whom he married in 1929; they had two children: Carol Bergerman and Stanley Bergerman Jr. His wife and daughter predeceased him and he remarried to Fay Schiller with whom he had two stepdaughters: Nancy Tack and Joan Silver. Bergerman died of cancer in Los Angeles.

Filmography

1930

References

External links 
 

1903 births
1998 deaths
20th-century American Jews
American film producers
American talent agents
American real estate businesspeople
People from Pueblo, Colorado
People from San Diego
Jewish American film producers